The Wokiro River is a seasonal watercourse in Eritrea. It ends north of Massawa, at the Red Sea. Prior to its terminus, the Wokiro merges with the Wadi Laba River.

See also
 List of rivers of Eritrea

References

Rivers of Eritrea